is a football stadium in Tokyo, Japan.

It was used as football stadium of the 1958 Asian Games.

External links

Football venues in Japan
Sports venues in Tokyo
Venues of the 1958 Asian Games
Asian Games football venues